My Sex Life... or How I Got into an Argument is a 1996 French drama film directed by Arnaud Desplechin. It competed for the Palme d'Or at the 1996 Cannes Film Festival. It won the César Award for Most Promising Actor (Mathieu Amalric) and was also nominated for Most Promising Actress (Emmanuelle Devos and Jeanne Balibar). The film ensured Desplechin's and Amalric's career launches in the 90s as respected director and actor respectively (although they had both initially worked towards the reverse). Historically it also marks one of Marion Cotillard's very first roles in the industry.    

My Sex Life... follows the story of a PhD student and lecturer in philosophy, Paul Dédalus, as he struggles to break up with his longtime girlfriend, has conflicted feelings about his two mistresses - who are also his friends' partners -, and has a difficult time facing a new colleague, appointed head of the "epistemology department", a former friend who dislikes him for reasons Paul cannot remember. The Catholic conversion and religious concerns of Paul's younger brother, Ivan, are a subplot in the movie. 

Being nearly three hours long, the movie's representation of a daily life in Paris follows a similar pattern to Jean Eustache's The Mother and the Whore from 1973, a cult post-French New Wave film lasting three hours and forty minutes. Similar dialogues and epigrammatic lines or quotations on life, love and friendship are found in both works. Maurice Pialat's interest for "realistic" circumstances has been cited by Desplechin as a major influence on his work in general.

Other versions of the Paul Dédalus character appear in A Christmas Tale (2008) and My Golden Days (2015), the last one being a much more explicit prequel. These later productions both feature Amalric.

Cast
 Mathieu Amalric as Paul Dedalus
 Emmanuelle Devos as Esther
 Marianne Denicourt as Sylvia
 Emmanuel Salinger as Nathan
 Thibault de Montalembert as Bob
 Chiara Mastroianni as Patricia
 Denis Podalydès as Jean-Jacques
 Jeanne Balibar as Valérie
 Fabrice Desplechin as Ivan
 Hélène Lapiower as Le Mérou
 Michel Vuillermoz as Frédéric Rabier
 Roland Amstutz as Chernov
 Marion Cotillard as Student

References

External links

1996 films
1996 drama films
French drama films
1990s French-language films
Films directed by Arnaud Desplechin
Films with screenplays by Arnaud Desplechin
Films set in Paris
1990s French films